Highly Evolved is the debut studio album by Australian alternative rock band The Vines. It was released on 14 July 2002 on Capitol Records. Produced by Rob Schnapf, known for his collaboration with Tom Rothrock on Elliott Smith's albums Either/Or, XO, and Figure 8, Highly Evolved was an immensely popular debut, part of a trend towards garage rock revival bands known as much for the relentless hype from the UK music press as for their music; The Vines were frequently compared to Nirvana. The debut single, "Highly Evolved", was chosen as Single of the Week by influential British music magazine NME. The magazine also voted it the 2nd best album of the year in 2002. The album was also included in the book 1001 Albums You Must Hear Before You Die. In October 2010, it was listed in the book 100 Best Australian Albums.

Recording and mastering 

Highly Evolved was recorded and mixed at The Sound Factory and Sunset Sound Recorders in Hollywood, California. It was recorded between July 2001 and February 2002.

Track listing

Personnel 

 Performance

 Craig Nicholls – vocals, guitar, percussion, piano ("Homesick") and cover painting
 Patrick Matthews – organ ("Autumn Shade" and "In the Jungle"), bass guitar, piano ("Mary Jane", "Autumn Shade" and "Factory")
 Dave Olliffe – drums on "Highly Evolved", "Autumn Shade", "Outtathaway", "Sunshinin'", "Homesick" (outro only), "Country Yard", "Mary Jane" and "1969"
 Victor Indrizzo – drums on "In the Jungle"
 Joey Waronker – drums on "Get Free"
 Pete Thomas – drums on "Factory", "Ain't No Room" and "Homesick" (excerpt)
 Roger Joseph Manning Jr. – keyboards ("Highly Evolved", "Outtathaway", "Sunshinin'" and "Autumn Shade")

 Production

 Kevin Dean – production assistant
 Ted Jensen – mastering
 Ethan Johns – additional percussion ("Get Free", "Autumn Shade", "Factory" and "Sunshinin'")
 Rob Schnapf – additional guitars ("County Yard", "Homesick", "Ain't No Room" and "Factory"), production and mixing
 Andrew Slater – executive production
 Justin Stanley – production ("In the Jungle")
 Andy Wallace – mixing ("Get Free")
 Doug Boehm – engineering
 Steven Rhodes – additional percussion ("Get Free", "Autumn Shade", "Factory" and "Sunshinin'") and additional engineering
 Tony Rambo – engineering ("In the Jungle")
 Craig Conard – production assistant

Charts

Weekly charts

Year-end charts

Certifications

References

2002 debut albums
Albums produced by Rob Schnapf
Capitol Records albums
The Vines (band) albums